Berger Holton Loman (24 August 1886 – 9 May 1968) was a U.S. Army soldier, assigned to Company H, 132d Infantry, 33d Division. Born in Norway, he received the Medal of Honor for his actions near Consenvoye, France, on October 9, 1918, during World War I.

Medal of Honor citation

Rank and organization: Private, U.S. Army, Company H, 132d Infantry, 33d Division.
Place and date: Near Consenvoye, France, 9 October 1918.
Entered service at: Chicago, Illinois.
Born. 24 August 1886, Bergen, Norway.
General Order No. 16. Department of War 1919.

Citation

When his company had reached a point within 100 yards [30 meters] of its objective, to which it was advancing under terrific machine gun fire, Pvt. Loman voluntarily and unaided made his way forward after all others had taken shelter from the direct fire of an enemy machine gun. He crawled to a flank position of the gun and, after killing or capturing the entire crew, turned the machine gun on the retreating enemy.

See also

List of Medal of Honor recipients for World War I

References

1886 births
Norwegian emigrants to the United States
United States Army soldiers
United States Army personnel of World War I
United States Army Medal of Honor recipients
Norwegian-born Medal of Honor recipients
1968 deaths
Burials at Arlington National Cemetery
World War I recipients of the Medal of Honor